Leon Ichaso (born August 3, 1948) is a Cuban-American writer and film director. Some of his prominent works include El Super, Bitter Sugar, and others.

Biography

Early life
Leon Ichaso was born in Havana, Cuba, on August 3, 1948. Ichaso migrated to Mexico at the age of 14 and then to the United States with his mother, Antonia Ichaso, and sister, Mari Rodriguez Ichaso. His father initially stayed behind in Cuba to support the Cuban Revolution. Five years later, Ichaso's father joined his family in New York.

Career
As a director, Leon Ichaso's first movie was the Spanish-language feature El Super (1979), based on an Off-Broadway play about an immigrant building superintendent trying to make his way in New York. 

When entering the Hollywood scene, Ichaso told stories of the big city slotted into action series' on TV (e.g., Miami Vice, Crime Story, The Equalizer) and TV movies as The Fear Inside, The Take, A Table at Ciro's and A Kiss to Die For. Ichaso later directed Wesley Snipes's Sugar Hill (1994), a character study wedded to a violent crime drama of a New York drug empire.

In the Dominican Republic and Cuba in 1996, Ichaso made Azúcar Amarga (Bitter Sugar), a Spanish language film about a disillusioned Cuban Communist.

For the next several years, Ichaso worked on several TV movies, some of which were adaptations of plays. Zooman (Showtime, 1995) was an adaptation of an Off-Broadway play dealing with a family coping with the murder of child. Execution of Justice (Showtime, 1999) was also derived from a play, which detailed the events behind the murders of San Francisco mayor George Moscone and supervisor Harvey Milk.

Ichaso next directed small screen biographies Ali: An American Hero (Fox, 2000) and Hendrix (Showtime, 2000). He later wrote and directed Piñero (2001), a biographical movie about the life of Puerto Rican author Miguel Piñero.

After working again for Showtime (Sleeper Cell, 2005), Cane, The Cleaner (A&E), Persons Unknown (Fox/Televisa 2008 and 2009), developing his own future projects ("Monk"), and teaching movie directing in France, in 2004, Ichaso started working on the screenplay of salsa singer Héctor Lavoe's biography, El Cantante. This movie was shot in 2006 and stars Jennifer Lopez and Marc Anthony.

His last movie Paraiso, filmed in Miami in 2008, opened during the 2009 Miami International Film Festival in March 2009.

References

External links

1948 births
Living people
American film directors
American television directors
American people of Cuban descent
People from Havana
 Cuban expatriates in Mexico